Dreamtime is the second solo studio album by American musician Tom Verlaine, originally released in 1981. "Without a Word" is a rewrite of "Hard On Love," an unreleased Television song performed live in 1974 and 1975.

The album was reissued in 1994 by Infinite Zero Archive/American Recordings label, with two bonus tracks drawn from the 1981 "Always" 7" & 12" single. It was reissued in 2008 by Collectors' Choice Music with no bonus tracks.

Track listing
All songs written by Tom Verlaine.

Side one
 "There's a Reason" – 3:39
 "Penetration" – 4:01
 "Always" – 3:58
 "The Blue Robe" – 3:54
 "Without a Word" – 3:17

Side two
 "Mr Blur" – 3:24
 "Fragile" – 3:27
 "A Future in Noise" – 4:13
 "Down on the Farm" – 4:49
 "Mary Marie" – 3:25

Bonus tracks (1994 CD reissue)
 "The Blue Robe" (alternate version) – 4:17
 "Always" (alternate version) – 4:09

Personnel
Tom Verlaine – guitars, solos, vocals on all tracks; bass on "Penetration"
Ritchie Fliegler – guitars on all tracks, except "Penetration"
Fred Smith – bass on "Mr. Blur", "Down on the Farm", "There's a Reason" and "Without a Word"
Donnie Nossov – bass on "Always", "Mary Marie", "Fragile", "The Blue Robe", "A Future in Noise" and bonus tracks
Jay Dee Daugherty – drums on "Mr. Blur", "Down on the Farm", "There's a Reason", "Without a Word" and "Penetration"
Rich Teeter – drums on "Always", "Mary Marie", "Fragile", "The Blue Robe", "A Future in Noise" and bonus tracks
Bruce Brody – keyboards on "Always", "Mary Marie", end of "Penetration" and "Always" (alternate version)
Technical
Robert Clifford – engineer
David Chenkin, John Terelle, Steve Ett – assistant engineers
George Delmerico – design
James Hamilton – photography

Charts
Album

Notes 

Tom Verlaine albums
1981 albums
Warner Records albums